Rokautskyia pseudoglaziovii is a species of flowering plant in the family Bromeliaceae, endemic to Brazil (the state of Espírito Santo). It was first described in 1991 as Cryptanthus pseudoglaziovii. The epithet is also spelt pseudoglazioui.

References

pseudoglaziovii
Flora of Brazil
Plants described in 1991